The 2019 MAAC men's soccer tournament, was the 27th edition of the MAAC Men's Soccer Tournament, a post-season college soccer conference tournament to determine the MAAC champion, and the conference's automatic berth into the NCAA Division I men's soccer tournament. The 2019 edition of the tournament began on November 10 and concluded on November 17, 2019.

Iona won the 2019 MAAC title, which was the program's first ever MAAC championship, allowing them to earn their first ever berth into the NCAA Tournament. There, they lost in the opening round to defending national champions, Maryland.

Seeds

Bracket

Schedule

First round

Semifinals

Championship

Statistics

Goalscorers
3 Goals
  Josh Plimpton – Iona

2 Goals
  Mauro Bravo – Iona
  Jordan Jowers – Saint Peter's

1 Goal

  Brage Aasen – Quinnipiac
  Tom Climpson – Saint Peter's
  Stefan Copetti – Marist
  Jamie Davis – Saint Peter's
  Allen Gavilanes – Marist
  Francisco Gomez Olano – Rider
  Justin Jaime – Marist
  Brandon Joseph-Buadi – Manhattan
  Dominic Laws – Saint Peter's
  Esad Mackic – Iona
  Najim Romero – Iona
  Antek Sinkel – Marist

All-Tournament team

References

External links 
 2019 MAAC Men's Soccer Tournament Central

2019 NCAA Division I men's soccer season
2019 in sports in Connecticut
2019 in sports in New Jersey
2019 in sports in New York (state)
Maac Men's Soccer Tournament